Share-alike (🄎) is a copyright licensing term, originally used by the Creative Commons project, to describe works or licenses that require copies or adaptations of the work to be released under the same or similar license as the original. Copyleft licenses are free content or free software  licenses with a share-alike condition.

Two currently-supported Creative Commons licenses have the ShareAlike condition: Creative Commons Attribution-ShareAlike (a copyleft, free content license) and Creative Commons Attribution-NonCommercial-ShareAlike (a proprietary license).

The term has also been used outside copyright law to refer to a similar plan for patent licensing.

Copyleft

Copyleft or libre share-alike licenses are the largest subcategory of share-alike licenses. They include both free content licenses like Creative Commons Attribution-ShareAlike and free software licenses like the GNU General Public License. These licenses have been described pejoratively as viral licenses, because the inclusion of copyleft material in a larger work typically requires the entire work to be made copyleft. The term reciprocal license has also been used to describe copyleft, but has also been used for non-libre licenses (see, for example, the Microsoft Limited Reciprocal License).

Free content and software licenses without the share-alike requirement are described as permissive licenses.

Creative Commons
As with all six licenses in the current Creative Commons suite, CC Attribution-ShareAlike and CC Attribution-NonCommercial-ShareAlike require attribution. According to Creative Commons, the advantage of this license is that future users are not able to add new restrictions to a derivative of your work; their derivatives must be licensed the same way.

The 3.0 and 4.0 version of the ShareAlike licenses include a compatibility clause, allowing Creative Commons to declare other licenses as compatible and therefore derivatives may use these instead of the license of the original work.

Version history

Over the years, Creative Commons has issued 5 versions of the BY-SA and BY-NC-SA licenses (1.0, 2.0, 2.5, 3.0 and 4.0).

Attribution-ShareAlike Version 1.0 Generic and Attribution-NonCommercial-ShareAlike Version 1.0 Generic – Released December, 2002
Attribution-ShareAlike Version 2.0 Generic and Attribution-NonCommercial-ShareAlike Version 2.0 Generic – Released May, 2004
Attribution-ShareAlike Version 2.5 Generic and Attribution-NonCommercial-ShareAlike Version 2.5 Generic – Released June, 2005
Attribution-ShareAlike Version 3.0 Unported and Attribution-NonCommercial-ShareAlike Version 3.0 Unported – Released March, 2007
Attribution-ShareAlike Version 4.0 International and Attribution-NonCommercial-ShareAlike Version 4.0 International – Released November, 2013

See also
Wikipedia's CC Attribution-ShareAlike license

References

Public copyright licenses
Copyleft
Free software
Creative Commons

vi:Giấy phép Creative Commons#Chia sẻ tương tự